Hatice Duman (born April 5, 1974 in Malatya) is a Kurdish journalist and editor-in-chief of the daily Atılım (The Leap), the official newspaper of the Marxist–Leninist Communist Party (MLKP) in Turkey. Since April 9, 2003, she has been  in prison, accused of being a manager of a terrorist organisation. On October 16, 2012, Turkey's Supreme Court of Appeals confirmed the sentence of  life-time imprisonment against her.

Early years 
Hatice Duman was born in the eastern province of Malatya on April 5, 1974. Her family moved to [the southeastern province of Gaziantep for economic reasons and she finished elementary and middle school there. She graduated from Trakya University's Vocational School of Higher Education in 1996.

Journalistic career 
She began working as a reporter for Atılım in 1996 and in 1997 started working on the chief editor's desk for the same newspaper.

Imprisonment 
The police raided Duman's house on April 9, 2003, claiming Duman was someone they were searching for in relation to two robberies. Duman was convicted of making propaganda and being a member of the banned Marxist Leninist Communist Party (MLKP), and given a lifetime sentence in 2011.

According to a report by Füsun Erdoğan, Duman said: "the state employed all its violence and repression to prevent us from perceiving, seeing and writing the truth. All the issues we published were confiscated, and we were prevented from following the news. Our cameras and recorders were broken. They seized our computers. They filed suits against the confiscated issues of our newspaper."

She is currently held in Bakırköy Prison in İstanbul.

See also
List of arrested journalists in Turkey

References 

1974 births
Living people
Turkish journalists
Prisoners sentenced to life imprisonment by Turkey
Turkish prisoners sentenced to life imprisonment
Trakya University alumni
Journalists imprisoned in Turkey